Upper Tasahe is a suburb of Honiara, Solomon Islands located west of the main center and south of White River.

References

Populated places in Guadalcanal Province
Suburbs of Honiara